The Gourou Banda Solar Power Station is a planned  solar power plant in Niger. This renewable energy infrastructure project will be developed by an independent power producer (IPP), under the build-own-operate-transfer (BOOT) model, with support from the International Finance Corporation (IFC), a member of the World Bank Group, as part of the bank's "Scaling Solar" program. The solar farm, first conceived in 2018, as a 20 megawatts installation, was expanded to capacity of 50 megawatts in 2020.

Location
The solar farm will sit adjacent to the existing 100 megawatts Gorou Banda Thermal Power Station, in Gorou Banda, in Commune V of the city of Niamey, the capital and largest city in the country.

Overview
As of September 2021, Niger's national generation capacity was reported as 284 megawatts, all of it derived from expensive "fossil fuels". The national electrification rate was 18.8 percent, in 2019, with the government of Niger aiming to raise that rate to 80 percent by 2035, with 30 percent of generating capacity derived from renewable sources.

The Gorou Banda Solar Plant represents the first grid-ready renewable energy source in the country. The electricity generated at this power station will be sold to Société Nigérienne d'Electricité (Nigelec), the Electricity Company of Niger. The World Bank's "Scaling Solar" program works in a complimentary manner to meet the goals of the stakeholders.

Developers
In September 2021, the Government of Niger called for pre-qualification of eligible IPPs to tender for the construction of this power station. "Interested IPPs have until 22 November 2021 to apply". IFC is acting as advisor to the government of Niger, in this process.

In February 2022, six IPPs were selected in the first round to continue bidding for the rights to develop this power station. Those six winners are identified in the table below.

Construction costs and funding
The construction costs were estimated at US$70 million in 2020.
Two institutions have pledged financial support. The French Development Agency (AFD) has agreed to lend €23.5 million and the European Union has promised to lend €5 million towards this development.

See also

List of power stations in Niger

References

External links
 Approximate Location of Gourou Banda Solar Power Station

Solar power stations in Niger
Niamey
Proposed energy infrastructure